Ghetto Cyrano is the debut studio album by American R&B duo Christión. It was released on November 4, 1997 via Roc-A-Fella Records/Def Jam Recordings. Production was handled by the duo themselves, also serving as executive producers together with Damon Dash, Jay-Z and Kareem "Biggs" Burke. The album peaked at number 146 on the Billboard 200 and number 23 on the Top R&B/Hip-Hop Albums. It was supported with two singles "Full of Smoke", which peaked at No. 53 on the Billboard Hot 100, and "I Wanna Get Next to You".

Track listing

Personnel
Allen Anthony – vocals, producer, executive producer
Kenni Ski – vocals, producer, executive producer
Herb Powers Jr. – mastering
Shawn "Jay-Z" Carter – executive producer
Damon "Dame" Dash – executive producer
Kareem "Biggs" Burke – executive producer
Keith Major – photography

Charts

References

External links

1997 debut albums
Roc-A-Fella Records albums
Funk albums by American artists
Soul albums by American artists